Mehr is the seventh month of the Solar Hijri calendar, the official calendar of Iran and Afghanistan. Mehr has thirty days. It begins in September and ends in October by the Gregorian calendar. 

Mehr is the first month of autumn, and is followed by Aban.

It is named after the Iranian deity Mithra.

Events 
 21 Mehr - 1154 - Continental Navy established
 29 Mehr - 1184 - Battle of Trafalgar
 8 Mehr - 1282 - Game 1 of the 1903 World Series, the first ever in the modern Major League Baseball era, begins in Boston's Huntington Avenue Baseball Grounds.
 17 Mehr - 1290 - Wuchang (Wuhan) Uprising - Xinhai Revolution in China marks the beginning of the end of Qing imperial rule.
 4 Mehr - 1299 - The first regular season games of the future National Football League officially begin.
 12 - 1324 - Establishment of the Indonesian National Armed Forces
 9 - 1328 - Proclamation of the People's Republic of China
 8 - 1344 - 30 September coup attempt in Indonesia.
 20 - 1350 - Celebrations of the 2,500 year celebration of the Persian Empire officially commence.
 23 - 1358 - Salvadorian Civil War begins
 11 - 1369 - German reunification
 21 - 1370 - USS Cole bombing
 18 - 1394 - 2015 Ankara bombings
 10 - 1401 - Ukrainian victory in the Second Battle of Lyman

Deaths 

 27 - 1392 - Mahmoud Zoufonoun, Iranian musician. 
 22 - 1395 - Bhumibol Adulyadej

Holidays 
 Mitrakana - 1 Mehr 
 Meskel - 5 or 6 Mehr 
 National Day of Pancasila Sanctity and 30 September Movement Memorial Day - 8 or 9 Mehr
 Mehregan - 8 or 9 Mehr
 National Day of the People's Republic of China - 8 or 9 Mehr
 German Unity Day - 11/12 Mehr 
 Feast of the Holy Rosary - 14/15 Mehr
 National Day of the Republic of China - 16 or 17 Mehr 
 Columbus Day and National Day of Spain -20 or 21 Mehr
 United States Navy Birthday - 21 or 22 Mehr
 Defenders Day (Ukraine) - 22 or 23 Mehr
 Bhumibol Adulyadej Death Anniversary Memorial Day - 23-24 Mehr
 Trafalgar Day - 29 Mehr (28 in non-leap years)

References 

Months of the Iranian calendar